Amigo Supermarkets is a chain of supermarkets located in Puerto Rico and owned by Pueblo.

History
In the 1920s, Supermercados Amigo was opened by Jose Marti Fuentes. During the company's formative years, it operated small supermarkets across the island; these would be located at small strip malls. Many towns in Puerto Rico had multiple Supermercados Amigo locations.

The transformation
After the Grand Union and Coop Supermarkets companies ceased operations in Puerto Rico, Amigo began plans to become a major player in Puerto Rico's supermarket industry. In 1989, they opened their first major store, located at Plaza del Carmen Mall, in Caguas. Subsequently, many other major stores were opened across Puerto Rico. A massive television campaign  began, and their slogan, Amigo, lo mejor al mejor precio (Amigo, the best at the best prices) became a household phrase in Puerto Rico.

Economic problems
Amigo ran into serious economic problems in the 1990s, most of them having to do with employee salary. As a consequence, the company began losing money. There were several strikes, and these received wide media attention.

Walmart acquisition
In July 2002,  American retail giant Walmart  purchased Supermercados Amigo, in what became a controversial business move. Claims of unfair competition and monopoly were instantly made by smaller supermarkets, because Amigo would be backed by the strong assets of Walmart. As part of the agreement made in order for the purchase to take place, various supermarket locations had to be closed (specifically if there was a Walmart or Sam's Club nearby). The closed Amigos became part of a new (at the time) supermarkets company known as "SuperMax" and "Pitusa Markets".

The structure of the supermarkets themselves was not changed because of the purchase, the only exception being that now customers may pay for their purchases with their respective Sam's Club or Walmart Credit Cards.

In January 2016, Walmart announced it would close four Amigo stores (plus all three Super Ahorros stores) located throughout the island, as part of a larger wave of store closures.

2019 renovations
On November 5, 2019, Amigo Supermarkets announced a renovation plan on its stores nationwide that would cost $7.8 million US dollars.

Supermercados Pueblo acquisition
In July 2022, Walmart announced that it would sell the Amigo chain to Pueblo.

In June 2022, the closing of the last Amigo supermarket by Walmart was announced, this was located in Dorado and the sale of the remaining 11 Amigo Supermarkets to Pueblo Supermarkets was announced, the brand name will remain and the 1,100 employees They will keep their jobs. On August 26, 2022, the Amigo supermarkets closed their doors at 6pm to begin the transition of Matrix companies from Walmart to Pueblo, the possible reopening of the Amigo is scheduled for September 1.

References

External links
 

Retail companies established in 1989
1989 establishments in Puerto Rico
Food and drink companies of Puerto Rico
Puerto Rican brands
Supermarkets of Puerto Rico
Supermarkets of the United States
Amigo